The traditional French units of measurement prior to metrification were established under Charlemagne during the Carolingian Renaissance. Based on contemporary Byzantine and ancient Roman measures, the system established some consistency across his empire but, after his death, the empire fragmented and subsequent rulers and variously localities introduced their own variants. Some of Charlemagne's units, such as the king's foot remained virtually unchanged for about a thousand years, while others important to commercesuch as the French ell used for cloth and the French pound used for amountsvaried dramatically from locality to locality. By the 18th century, the number of units of measure had grown to the extent that it was almost impossible to keep track of them and one of the major legacies of the French Revolution was the dramatic rationalization of measures as the new metric system. The change was extremely unpopular, however, and a metricized version of the traditional unitsthe had to be brought back into use for several decades.

History 

Although in the pre-revolutionary era (before 1795) France used a system and units of measure that had many of the characteristics of contemporary English units (or the later Imperial System of units), France still lacked a unified, countrywide system of measurement. Whereas in England the Magna Carta had decreed that "there shall be one unit of measure throughout the realm", Charlemagne and successive kings had tried but failed to impose a unified system of measurement in France.

The names and relationships of many units of measure were adopted from Roman units of measure, and many more were added – it has been estimated that there were seven or eight hundred different names for the various units of measure. Moreover, the quantity associated with each unit of measure differed from town to town and even from trade to trade. Some of the differences were large: for example the lieue (league) could vary from 3.268 km in Beauce to 5.849 km in Provence. It has been estimated that on the eve of the Revolution a quarter of a million different units of measure were in use in France.
Although certain standards, such as the pied du Roi (the King's foot) had a degree of pre-eminence and were used by savants, many traders chose to use their own measuring devices, giving scope for fraud and hindering commerce and industry.

Tables of units of measure 

These definitions use the Paris definitions for the coutume of Paris, and definitions for other Ancien régime civil jurisdictions varied, at times quite significantly.

Length 
The medieval royal units of length were based on the toise, and in particular the toise de l'Écritoire, the distance between the fingertips of the outstretched arms of a man, which was introduced in 790 by Charlemagne.

The toise had 6 pieds (feet) each of 326.6 mm (12.86 in). In 1668 the reference standard was found to have been deformed, and it was replaced by the toise du Châtelet which, to accommodate the deformation of the earlier standard, was around 11 mm (0.55%) shorter.

In 1747 this toise was replaced by a new toise of near-identical length – the Toise du Pérou, custody of which was given to l'Académie des Sciences au Louvre.

Although the pouce (inch), pied (foot) and toise (fathom) were fairly consistent throughout most of pre-revolutionary France, some areas had local variants of the toise. Other units of measure such as the aune (ell), the perche (perch or rood), the arpent and the lieue (league) had a number of variations, particularly the aune (which was used to measure cloth).

The loi du 19 frimaire an VIII (Law of 10 December 1799) states that one decimal metre is exactly 443.296 French lines, or 3 pieds 11.296 lignes de la "Toise du Pérou".
Thus the French royal foot is exactly  metres (about 0.3248 m).

In Quebec, the surveys in French units were converted using the relationship 1 pied (of the French variety, the same word being used for English feet as well) = 12.789 English inches. This makes the Quebec pied very slightly smaller (about 4 parts in one million) than the pied used in France.

The French pica, called Cicéro, measured 12 Didot points or  inch.

Area

Volume – liquid measures

Volume – dry measures

Mass 
{| class="wikitable sortable" style="float:right;"
|+ The Parisian equivalents (in livres) of 100 local livres in various towns in 1768(approximations per source)
|-
| Abbeville || align=right | 93–94
|-
| Avignon || align=right | 83
|-
| Beaucare || align=right | 95
|-
| Bordeaux || align=right | 100
|-
| Bourg-en-Bresse || align=right | 96
|-
| Dunkirk || align=right | 87
|-
| Lille || align=right | 87–88
|-
| Lyon || align=right | 87
|-
| Marseilles || align=right | 81
|-
| Montepellier || align=right | 83
|-
| Nancy || align=right | 94–95
|-
| Nantes || align=right | 101–102
|-
| La Rochelle || align=right | 101–102
|-
| Rouen (poids de vicomté) || align=right | 103
|-
| Strasbourg (petit poids) || align=right | 96
|-
| Toulouse || align=right | 84
|}

Charlemagne's system had 12 onces (ounces) to the livre (pound).
Between 1076 and 1093 King Philip I instituted a system of poids de marc (mark weight) used for minting coin, with 8 onces to a marc.

King Jean II constructed a new standard of measures, including a livre actuelle ("current" pound, also known as a livre de poids de marc or "mark weight" pound) of 2 marcs, i.e. 16 onces.
The Charlemagne 12-ounce livre became known as the livre esterlin ("true" pound) in order to distinguish it.
″Esterlin″ was an Old French word (ca. 1190, Anglo-Norman dialect) that referred to Scottish coin (sterling, or ″denier″). As references cited later on this page show, its application changed over time in accordance with the changing historical context, though it is not current in Modern French.

The livre actuelle could be sub-divided into 2 demi-livres (half-pounds), 4 quarterons, or 8 demi-quarterons.
Conversely, there were 100 livres in a quintal (c.f. English hundredweight).
The fractional parts of an once had different names in Apothecary measure (used in medicine) and measure of precious metals, but the fractional ratios were themselves the same: 1 once was 8 drachme (Apothecary, c.f. English dram) or gros; 1 drachme/gros was 3 scruples (Apothecary, c.f. English scruple) or deniers, and 1 scruple/denier was 24 grains.
This makes 384 deniers in a livre in weight measure, which contrasts with the old monetary livre in France which was divided into 240 deniers.

Jean II's standards are preserved in the Conservatoire Nationale des Arts et Métiers, which also holds a set of later-still physical standards from the 15th century, the so-called pile de Charlemagne.
This pile defined the weight of 50 marcs, i.e. 400 onces, and thus 25 livres actuelles, or 33 livres esterlins.
It had been kept in the royal palaces originally.
In 1540 King François I had transferred it to the Cour des monnaies, where it had been held in a cabinet with three locks, whose keys had been held separately by the president of the Cour, one of its counsellors, and a clerk.

The thirteen individual pieces that made up the Parisian pile de Charlemagne comprised an outer containing cylinder nominally weighing 20 marcs, and a set of hollow nesting cups within, topped with a filled weight as the smallest piece.
The heaviest cups were nominally 14, 8, 4, and 2 marcs, sub-totalling 48 marcs (including the 20 marc outer container); followed by a nominally 1 marc hollow cup which was termed the marc creux (hollow mark); and followed by 6 further cups (4, 2, and 1 onces, and 4, 2, and 1 gros) with a final seventh filled 1 gros weight, all totalling 1 marc, which was termed the marc plein (filled mark).

Unfortunately, the weights were not consistent, with the marc plein not being the same weight as the marc creux, and neither being the same as a mean 1 marc weight determined from the weight of the whole pile.
So when the time came to work out the conversion factors between these measures and the metric system, the whole pile was taken to define 50 Parisian standard marcs, and thus 230 400 grains (the number of grains in 50 marcs).
Louis Lefèvre‑Gineau initially determined that the metric mass of the whole pile was 12.227 947 5 kg, later corrected to 12.2376 kg, thereby making (by division and rounded to three decimal places) a marc 244.753 g, a livre esterlin 367.129 g, and a livre actuelle 489.506 g.
Hence further the (Parisian) once was 30.594 g, the gros/drachme was 3.824 g, the denier/scruple was 1.274 g, and the grain was 0.053 g.

However, the actual masses of the pre-metric measures were nowhere near even this simple.
These were just the Parisian standards, and individual provinces, cities, and even guilds, all had their own reference physical standards, which were not checked against one another and which sometimes conflated esterlin and actuelle.
For just some examples: the Marseille livre was 399.6 g, the Montpelier one 394.9 g, the Toulon one 465.5 g, and the Toulouse one 413.2 g; with all of the fractional subdivisions having different values accordingly.
The Limoges marc was 240.929 g, the Tours one 237.869 g, and the Troyes one 250.050 g.

Furthermore, there were also livres comprising different numbers of onces to both the actuelle and esterlin, including livres of 14, 18, and 20 onces, confusing things yet further.
The livre in the poids de table (table weight) systems used in Provence and Languedoc (and a common name for provincial weight systems in general alongside poids de pays, country weight, and poids de ville, town weight) was the same weight as 15 onces or even as low as 13 onces in the Parisian poids de marc, and the livre in the poids de soie (silk weight) system of Lyon was similarly just  the weight of the Parisian livre.
This caused an erroneous belief that these livres comprised 13, 14, or 15 onces, however this was a confusion stemming from the equivalent poids de marc weights, and both poids de table and poids de soie had 16 of their own, lighter, onces and so forth,
Rouen had a poids de vicomté'' system.

See also 

 International System of Units
 Jean-Antoine Chaptal
 Mansus
 Mesures usuelles
 Réaumur scale
 Systems of measurement
 Weights and measures

References

Sources 

 
 
 
 
 
 
 
 
 
 
 
 
 
 
 
 
 
 
 
 
 

Further reading 
 
 
 
 
 

Systems of units
Science and technology in France